Matador Soccer Field is a 1,550 seat soccer stadium on the campus of California State University, Northridge in Northridge, California.

It is currently the home to the Cal State Northridge Matadors men's soccer and Cal State Northridge Matadors women's soccer teams.

Matador Soccer Field was host to a 2005 NCAA Men's Division I Soccer Championship match between Big West Conference foe UC Santa Barbara.  The men's soccer team was victorious, scoring their first ever NCAA Tournament victory in a 3-2 decision.

References

External links
 Matador Soccer Field

College soccer venues in California
Cal State Northridge Matadors
Soccer venues in Los Angeles
Sports venues completed in 2002
2002 establishments in California